Joan Bright Astley, OBE (27 September 1910 – 24 December 2008), born Penelope Joan McKerrow Bright, organized the Special Information Centre (SIC) for Winston Churchill during World War II. As a young woman, she dated Ian Fleming and is believed to be one of the three or four women whose attributes were used by him for the character of Miss Moneypenny.

Biography
Joan Bright Astley was born in Monte Caseros, Corrientes, Argentina. Her father was an English accountant; her mother, a Scottish governess. Described as a difficult teenager, she attended a number of schools, learning shorthand and typing and working as a secretary at the British legation in Mexico. In the 1930s, she was offered a job, which she declined, in Nazi Germany, teaching English to the family of Rudolf Hess.

In 1939, she was told by a friend that she might have a chance of work if she went to a certain London Underground station one day, wearing a pink carnation. She did so and was guided to an office in Whitehall where she was met by a colonel, who had her sign the Official Secrets Act and warned her not to be seen by a certain person standing outside the building when she left. She was hired by D/MI(R), a section of the War Office concerned, among other things, with disrupting the flow of Romanian oil to the Third Reich.  Later in the war, she was employed by the Joint Planning Committee and given the job of running the Secret Intelligence Centre, which was in fact a single room in the Cabinet War Rooms. She had custody of secret papers and reports and, on instructions, would show a given report to a senior officer and allow him to read it in her office, under top secret conditions.  By all accounts, she made the officers welcome with her informal manner.  Subsequently, she became personal assistant to General Sir Hastings Ismay, a close associate of Winston Churchill's.

During the war, she dated Ian Fleming, and said of him, "I thought he was awfully attractive and fun, but elusive. I think he was a ruthless man – he would drop somebody if he didn't want them any more. That would be it."  She added, "No torrid love affair."

She served as an administrative officer at several wartime and postwar conferences.  She was appointed Officer of the Order of the British Empire (OBE) in the 1946 New Year Honours, when she was described as "Principal, Offices of the Cabinet and Minister of Defence." In 1949, she married Colonel Philip Astley, first husband of Madeleine Carroll, whom he had divorced in 1940.  Colonel Astley died in 1958. In 1971, Joan Astley wrote of her wartime life in a memoir, The Inner Circle: a View of War at the Top, and in 1993 co-authored a book on Sir Colin Gubbins. She died on Christmas Eve 2008.

According to Samantha Weinberg, author of The Moneypenny Diaries, which she published under the name Kate Westbrook, Astley is one of three or four women used by Fleming as the basis of Miss Moneypenny.

References

Sources

 Giles Milton The Ministry of Ungentlemanly Warfare, 2016, John Murray. 

1910 births
2008 deaths
Civil servants in the War Office
Civil servants in the Cabinet Office
Private secretaries in the British Civil Service
British military writers
Officers of the Order of the British Empire
British autobiographers
People from Monte Caseros
Argentine people of English descent
Women military writers
British women memoirists